Patrice Ernita "Penni" McClammy is an American attorney and politician serving as a member of the Alabama House of Representatives from the 76th district. She assumed office on November 17, 2021.

Early life and education 
A native of Montgomery, Alabama, McClammy attended Sidney Lanier High School. She earned a Bachelor of Arts degree in political science from Hampton University in 1997, an Associate of Arts in legal studies from Faulkner University in 1999, a Juris Doctor from the Thomas Goode Jones School of Law in 2002, and a PhD in public policy and administration from Florida State University in 2006.

Career 
Outside of politics, McClammy operates a private legal practice. After her father, Thad McClammy, died in office, Patrice declared her candidacy to succeed him. She did not face a challenger in the general election and assumed office on November 17, 2021.

References 

Living people
People from Montgomery, Alabama
Politicians from Montgomery, Alabama
Democratic Party members of the Alabama House of Representatives
Alabama lawyers
African-American state legislators in Alabama
Women state legislators in Alabama
Hampton University alumni
Faulkner University alumni
Thomas Goode Jones School of Law alumni
Florida State University alumni
Year of birth missing (living people)